Herbert Alexander "Hap" Mitchell (January 4, 1895 – January 12, 1969) was a Canadian ice hockey player who played 44 games with the Boston Bruins in the National Hockey League between 1924 and 1926. The rest of his career, which lasted from 1918 to 1928, was spent in various minor leagues. He was the first head coach of the Hershey Bears after the club went professional and became a member of the American Hockey League, coaching from 1938 to 1941.

Career statistics

Regular season and playoffs

External links
 

1895 births
1969 deaths
Boston Bruins players
Canadian ice hockey coaches
Canadian ice hockey left wingers
Eastern Hockey League coaches
Ice hockey people from Ontario
Hershey Bears coaches
New Haven Eagles players
People from Grey County
Canadian expatriate ice hockey players in the United States